The Minimum Data Set (MDS) is part of the U.S. federally mandated process for clinical assessment of all residents in Medicare or Medicaid certified nursing homes and non-critical access hospitals with Medicare swing bed agreements. (The term "swing bed" refers to the Social Security Act's authorizing small, rural hospitals to use their beds in both an acute care and Skilled Nursing Facility (SNF) capacity, as needed.) This process provides a comprehensive assessment of each resident's functional capabilities and helps nursing home and SNF staff identify health problems.

Resource Utilization Groups (RUG) are part of this process, and provide the foundation upon which a resident's individual care plan is formulated. MDS assessment forms are completed for all residents in certified nursing homes, including SNFs, regardless of source of payment for the individual resident. MDS assessments are required for residents on admission to the nursing facility and then periodically, within specific guidelines and time frames. Participants in the assessment process are health care professionals and direct care staff such as Registered Nurses, Licensed Practical/Vocational Nurses, Therapists, Social Services, Activities and Dietary staff employed by the nursing home. MDS information is transmitted electronically by nursing homes to the MDS database in their respective states. MDS information from the state databases is captured into the national MDS database at Centers for Medicare and Medicaid Services (CMS).

Sections of MDS (Minimum Data Set):

 Identification Information
 Hearing, Speech and Vision
 Cognitive Patterns
 Mood
 Behavior
 Preferences for Customary Routine and Activities
 Functional Status
 Functional Abilities and Goals
 Bladder and Bowel
 Active Diagnoses
 Health Conditions
 Swallowing/Nutritional Status
 Oral/Dental Status
 Skin Conditions
 Medications
 Special Treatments, Procedures and Programs
 Restraints
 Participation in Assessment and Goal Setting
 Care Area Assessment (CAA) Summary
 Correction Request
 Assessment Administration

The MDS is updated by the Centers for Medicare and Medicaid Services.  Specific coding regulations in completing the MDS can be found in the Resident Assessment Instrument User's Guide.  Versions of the Minimum Data Set has been used or is being utilized in other countries.

References

 CMS - MDS Quality Indicator and Resident Reports 

Centers for Medicare & Medicaid Services Long Term Care Facility Resident Assessment Instrument 3.0 User's Manual Version 1.16 October 2018

Health informatics
Medicare and Medicaid (United States)